Mary Ellis (1897–2003) was an American actress and singer.

Mary Ellis may also refer to:

Mary Beth Ellis (born 1977), American long-distance triathlete
Mary Elizabeth Ellis (born 1979), American actress
Mary Gordon Ellis (1889–1934), South Carolina state senator
Mary Ellis (pilot) (1917–2018), British World War II pilot
Mary Ellis (spinster) (1750–1828), spinster in New Brunswick, New Jersey
Mary Ellis grave, New Brunswick, New Jersey
Mary-Ellis Bunim (1946–2004), American television producer
Mary Ellis Peltz (1896–1981), American drama and music critic
Mary Ellis (Civil War nurse), Union nurse during the American Civil War
Mary H. Ellis, American sound designer
Mary Baxter Ellis (1892–1968), British commanding officer of the First Aid Nursing Yeomanry